The Ottawa River, also known as Ottawa Creek, is a short river, approximately  long (or about  if Tenmile Creek, the longest tributary, is included), in northwest Ohio and southeast Michigan in the United States. It drains an area on the Ohio-Michigan border along the eastern and northern fringes of the city of Toledo, goes through Ottawa Hills, and empties directly into Lake Erie. It is one of two rivers in northwestern Ohio that share the same name, along with the Ottawa River that is a tributary of the Auglaize River. The upper  of the river in Michigan north of Sylvania, Ohio is called North Tenmile Creek on federal maps, while another branch rising in Fulton County, Ohio, is called Tenmile Creek.

The river then flows southeast into western Toledo, where it turns northeast. It crosses the Michigan state line for its final , entering Little Maumee Bay on Lake Erie.

Pollutants
The water quality assessment of the lower section of the Ottawa River found many chemicals in the water with a hazard quotient greater than 1 (from highest to lowest concentration): lead, aluminum, PCBs, manganese, iron, DDT, thallium, selenium, chromium, nickel, cadmium, cyanide, and zinc.

The poor water quality results primarily from the river's form and structure, since it has a slow flow, and, secondly, from urban runoff and discharge from landfills and sewers. The City of Toledo has made it a priority to clean up the river. It has taken action to clear landfills and tributaries.

Dam removal
In 2001, the U.S. Fish and Wildlife Service proposed the removal of a long-standing dam in the Ottawa Hills stretch of the river to return the waterway to its natural flow and promote fish migration. It was also mentioned that the dam was a liability for the village. One dam was removed in 2007 and another in 2020.

See also
List of Michigan rivers
List of rivers of Ohio

References

External links 
University of Toledo Presidents Commission on the River, a commission of University of Toledo faculty, staff, and students working to clean up the Ottawa River.

Rivers of Michigan
Rivers of Ohio
Tributaries of Lake Erie
Rivers of Lucas County, Ohio
Rivers of Monroe County, Michigan